

References 

Post
Post-nominal letters
P